Joe Frickleton (c. 1935 – 14 December 2020) was a Scottish professional football player and manager, active primarily in South Africa

Playing career
Frickleton, who played as a wing half, played youth with Clydebank Juniors, before turning professional with East Stirlingshire, where he made 107 appearances in the Scottish Football League between 1959 and 1964.

He then moved to South Africa to play with Highlands Park, where he won three national championships.

Coaching career
After his playing days were over, Frickleton remained in South Africa, and trained as a football manager. His first job was at former club Highlands Park in 1974. After a season spent with Lusitano, Frickleton returned to Highlands Park until it was sold in 1983. He later won four trophies with Kaizer Chiefs in 1984, before winning the Champions Cup with Orlando Pirates in 1995.

Later life and death
He was hospitalised in May 2020 in Cape Town due to ill health. His death was reported on 15 December 2020.

Honours

Manager 
Highlands Park
NPSL Championship: 1980
NFL Championship: 1975
NFL Cup: 1975

Lusitano
NFL Cup: 1977

Kaiser Chiefs
NPSL Championship: 1984
MTN 8 Cup: 1985
Telkom Knockout Cup: 1984
Nedbank Cup: 1984

Orlando Pirates
CAF Champions League: 1995

References

Year of birth missing
2020 deaths
Scottish footballers
Scottish football managers
Clydebank Juniors F.C. players
East Stirlingshire F.C. players
Scottish Football League players
Scottish expatriate football managers
Kaizer Chiefs F.C. managers
Orlando Pirates F.C. managers
Highlands Park F.C. players
Scottish expatriate footballers
Expatriate soccer players in South Africa
Expatriate soccer managers in South Africa
Scottish expatriates in South Africa
Association football wing halves
Highlands Park F.C. managers
Lusitano F.C. (South Africa) managers